Kösüklü (formerly Kabalar) is a village in the Gölbaşı District, Adıyaman Province, Turkey. The village is populated by Kurds of the Atma tribe and had a population of 178 in 2021.

References 

Villages in Gölbaşı District, Adıyaman Province
Kurdish settlements in Adıyaman Province